is a district of Narashino City, Chiba Prefecture, Japan, consisting of 1-chōme to 4-chōme. The name “Okubo” is also used to refer to the area around Keisei Ōkubo Station.

Etymology

Demographics
The population as of September 2018 is shown below.

Transportation

Rail service
 Keisei Electric Railway -  Keisei Main Line
  Keisei Ōkubo Station

Bus service
 Narashino City Happy Bus - Keisei Ōkubo Station Route
 Okubo 1-chōme - Keisei Ōkubo Station North Entrance

Commerce
Commercial area locates to the north of Keisei Ōkubo Station.
 Okubo Shopping District
 Maruetsu Okubo-ekimae

Education
 Narashino City Okubo-Higashi Elementary School

References

External links
 Okubo Shopping District (in Japanese)

Populated places in Chiba Prefecture
Narashino